, branded as BRUZZ is a media company which serves the Flemish Community in Brussels. It is headquartered at Radio House in Ixelles.

History

1970–2014: Pre-merger era 
In 1985 it was renamed .

On September 15, 1993, the television channel  was launched from the Royal Flemish Theatre.

In 2002 a trilingual cultural supplement was added to : first  and later .

In 2000,  was launched as a student radio affiliated with the RITCS. On December 19, 2003, the station was licensed for 9 years.

In 2008 Anne Brumagne became editor in chief and the newspaper was renamed .

2014–present: Post-merger era 
On March 10, 2014, the organizations behind brusselnieuws.be, TV Brussel, FM Brussel, Agenda and BDW merged to form Vlaams-Brusselse Media based in the historic Radio House in Ixelles, producing web, radio and television content. On October 13, 2015, the Board of Directors of Vlaams-Brusselse Media announced a reorganization following a turbulent period after the previous CEO announced a round of resignations and the closure of FM Brussels.

On 20 April 2016 brusselnieuws.be, TV Brussel, FM Brussel, Agenda and BDW ceased to exist to form the cross-media brand BRUZZ with one single editorial staff.

In 2018 Vlaams-Brusselse Media launced BRUZZ Ket in collaboration with Onderwijscentrum Brussel (OCB). The digital children's and youth platform aims at Dutch-speaking and multilingual Brussels young people aged 9 to 13.

On April 19, 2022, Vlaams-Brusselse Media launched BRUZZ ICE a digital radio station

Editor-in-Chief

References

External links

Mass media in Brussels